Fédération Québecoise des Sports Cyclistes  or FQSC (the Quebec Cycling Federation) is the provincial governing body of cycle racing in Quebec, Canada.

The national governing body for Canada is the Canadian Cycling Association.

External links
 Fédération Québecoise des Sports Cyclistes official website

Cycle racing organizations
Cycle
Cycle racing in Canada
Cycling organizations in Canada
Cycle racing in Quebec